Christopher Muir (1931 - 2022) was an Australian director and producer, notable for his work in TV in the 1950s and 1960s. In the 1980s he was head of ABC Television drama.

Most of his early childhood was spent in France, but he returned to Melbourne upon the outbreak of World War II. He joined the ABC in 1949 at the recommendation of his headmaster upon completing his schooling at Melbourne Grammar School. Initially working as a messenger boy, he soon became a general trainee, and by 1954 he was a radio announcer. In 1955 the ABC seconded him to Paris to study television. He returned to Melbourne for the inauguration of ABC television in 1956. The ensuing decade saw him become a pioneer of television drama and music productions, often screened live-to-air during prime time on the ABC.

In an interview about the ABC's live TV drama he said "We producers had a buzz around us wherever we went but we also faced a lot of criticism. I thought 60 percent of what we did was okay and 40 percent I thought was dreadful. I recall doing several one-act plays by Australians but nothing memorable. There was no firm commitment to local material and we felt it was fascinating for viewers to see things like Chekov and some of the world's best drama."

Annette Andre said "he was very intelligent and more experienced. He wasn’t easy, but he could get a performance out of an actor."

He left in the early 70s to work in theatre, but soon returned. In 1982 he was appointed head of drama at the ABC. Uncomfortable with the politics of the role and changes taking place within the organisation, Muir left the ABC in 1987 after 38 years there.

He was married to actress and theatre director Elke Neidhardt, with whom he had a son, Fabian.

Select credits
Seeing Stars (1957) (variety)
Killer in Close-Up (1957) (TV play) - producer
The Duke in Darkness (1957) (TV play) - producer
Amahl and the Night Visitors (1957) (TV opera) - producer
Last Call (1958) (TV play) - producer
Outpost (1959) (TV play) - director
Black Chiffon (1959) (TV play) - producer
Antony and Cleopatra (1959) (TV play) - director
Till Death Do Us Part (1959) (TV play) - producer
Dinner with the Family (1959) (TV play) - producer
Albert Herring (1959) (TV play) - producer
The Astronauts (1960) (TV play) - producer
Uncle Martino (1960) (TV play) - producer
Eye of the Night (1960) (TV play) - director
The Bartered Bride (1960) (TV opera) - director
Waters of the Moon (1961) (TV play) - director
The Bloodless Sand (1961) (TV ballet) - director
The First Joanna (1961) (TV play) - producer
Sylvia (1961) (TV ballet) - producer
The Rivals (1961) (TV play) - director
Quiet Night (1961) (TV play) - producer
Marriage Lines (1962) (TV play) - director, producer
Martine (1961) (TV play) - producer
Boy Round the Corner (1962) (TV play) - producer
Fury in Petticoats (1962) (TV play) - producer
The Ambitious Servant Girl (1962) (TV opera) - producer
The Prodigal Son (1962) (TV opera) - producer
The Teeth of the Wind (1962) (TV play) - producer
She'll Be Right (1962) (TV play) - producer
One in Five (1963) (TV ballet) - producer
Man of Destiny (1963) (TV play) - producer
A Piece of Ribbon (1963) (TV play) - producer
The White Carnation (1963) (TV play) - producer
Bastien and Bastienne (1963) (TV opera) - producer
Robert Pomie Ballet (1963) (TV series) - producer
The Physicists (1964) (TV play) - director, producer
Six Characters in Search of an Author (1964) (TV play) - director, producer
Luther (1964) (TV play) - director, producer
Nude with Violin (1964) (TV play) - producer
Peter Grimes (1964) (TV opera) - producer
The Bloodless Sand (1964) (TV play) - producer
Everyman (1964) (TV play) - producer
The Tower (1965) (TV play) - director, producer
She (1967) (TV ballet) - director
Libido (1973) - executive producer
Lucky Colour Blue (1975) (TV series) - producer
Andra (1976) (TV series) - producer
Golden Pennies (1985) (TV mini series) - executive producer
Great Expectations the Untold Story (1988) - executive producer

References

External links

Christopher Muir at National Film and Sound Archive

Australian film directors
Australian television directors
1931 births
2022 deaths